Dog showmanship is a set of skills and etiquette used by handlers of dogs in a dog competition. Dog showmanship is not a competition in itself but a qualification of the handler to present a dog to its best advantage. Skills are technical as well as artistic. A handler must groom and display the dog for a judge in specific ways but a true showman can accentuate the best features of the dog and even mask any faults. Many professional handlers train and condition the dogs they accept into their program as they see fit. This means that dogs owned by others are away from home with their handlers for months at a time. Professional showmen may handle dogs as a sole source of income. 

Most often referring to handling for dog conformation competition, showmanship can also refer to hunting dog competition, racing dogs, and tracking dogs. It also refers to the sportsmanship of competitors; able to lose with grace, win with humility and unflappable in the face of unforeseen circumstances. 

A related competition is Junior Showmanship during which young dog handlers are judged on their showmanship skills regardless of the quality of the dog they use for the competition. They are scored on the grooming and handling of the dog as well as how the dog responds to them during the judging.

Equipment
In order to limit the distraction a leash and collar may be to a judge of dogs, showmanship includes use of specialized equipment, such as the show lead leash, which is quite thin and held out of view as much as possible. Many showman actually drop the leash while posing the dog and barely hold onto it while parading the dog around the ring to show off the dog's vitality and gait. A dog must be well trained to take full advantage of the show lead. 

Some dog handlers use trade secrets to trim and style a dog for the show ring. Forced air blow dryers, shampoo recipes, hair tonics and training to show a dog at his or her best are tricks of the trade used to advantage in competition.

See also
Junior Showmanship

Dog shows and showing